Grinnell College is a private liberal arts college in Grinnell, Iowa, United States. It was founded in 1846 when a group of New England Congregationalists established the Trustees of Iowa College.

Grinnell has the fifth highest endowment-to-student ratio of American liberal arts colleges, enabling need-blind admissions and substantial academic merit scholarships to boost socioeconomic diversity. Students receive funding for unpaid or underpaid summer internships and professional development (including international conferences and professional attire).

Among Grinnell alumni are 15 Rhodes Scholars, 5 Marshall Scholars, 16 Truman Scholars, 122 Fulbright grantees, 80 Watson Fellows, 20 Goldwater Scholars (since 2000), 1 Obama Scholar and 1 Nobel laureate. It is one of the top producers of Fulbright grantees. Its alumni include actor Gary Cooper, Nobel chemist Thomas Cech, Intel co-founder Robert Noyce, jazz musician Herbie Hancock, government administrator Harry Hopkins, and comedian Kumail Nanjiani.

The 120-acre campus includes several listings on the National Register of Historic Places as well as a César Pelli designed student center, integrated academic complexes, and athletics facilities. Grinnell College also manages significant real estate adjacent to the campus and in the historic downtown, a free-access golf course, and the 365-acre Conard Environmental Research Area.

History 

In 1843, eleven Congregational ministers, all of whom trained at Andover Theological Seminary in Massachusetts, set out to proselytize on the frontier. Each man pledged to gather a church and together the group or band would seek to establish a college. When the group arrived in Iowa later that year, each selected a different town in which to establish a congregation. In 1846, they collectively established Iowa College in Davenport. A few months later, Iowa joined the Union.

The first 25 years of Grinnell's history saw a change in name and location. In Davenport, the college had advocated against slavery and saloons, which led to conflict with the Davenport city council, which retaliated by constructing roads that transected the campus. In response, Iowa College moved farther west from Davenport to the town of Grinnell and unofficially adopted the name of its new home, which itself had been named for one of its founders: an abolitionist minister, Josiah Bushnell Grinnell, to whom journalist Horace Greeley supposedly wrote "Go West, young man, go West." However, Greeley vehemently denied ever saying this to Grinnell, or to anyone. The name of the corporation, "The Trustees of Iowa College," remained, but in 1909 the name "Grinnell" was adopted by the trustees for the institution.

In its early years, the college experienced setbacks. Although two students received Bachelor of Arts degrees in 1854 (the first to be granted by a college west of the Mississippi River), within 10 years the Civil War had claimed most of Grinnell's students and professors. In the decade following the war, growth resumed: women were officially admitted as candidates for degrees, and the curriculum was enlarged to include then-new areas of academic studies, such as natural sciences with laboratory work.

In 1882, Grinnell College was struck by a tornado — then called a cyclone, after which the college yearbook was named. The storm devastated the campus and destroyed both college buildings. Rebuilding began immediately, and the determination to expand wasn't limited to architecture: the curriculum was again extended to include departments in political science (one of the first in the United States — the University of Minnesota's department was founded in 1879, three years earlier) and modern languages.

Grinnell became known as the center of the Social Gospel reform movement, as Robert Handy writes, "The movement centered on the campus of Iowa (now Grinnell) College. Its leading figures were Professor George D. Herron and President George A. Gates". Other firsts pointed to the lighter side of college life: the first intercollegiate football and baseball games west of the Mississippi were played in Grinnell, and the home teams won.

As the 20th century began, Grinnell established a Phi Beta Kappa chapter, introduced the departmental "major" system of study, began Grinnell-in-China (an educational mission that lasted until the Japanese invasion and resumed in 1987), and built a women's residence hall system that became a national model. The social consciousness fostered at Grinnell during these years became evident during Franklin D. Roosevelt's presidency, when Grinnell graduates Harry Hopkins '12, Chester Davis '11, Paul Appleby '13, Hallie Flanagan '11, and Florence Kerr '12 became influential New Deal administrators.
Concern with social issues, educational innovation, and individual expression continue to shape Grinnell. As an example, the school's "5th year travel-service program," preceded the establishment of the Peace Corps by many years. Other recent innovations include first-year tutorials, cooperative pre-professional programs, and programs in quantitative studies and the societal impacts of technology. Every year, the college awards the $100,000 Grinnell College Innovator for Social Justice Prize, which is split between the recipient and their organization.

In 1975, Grinnell College through their Grinnell Communications subsidiary had purchased NBC affiliate WLWD from Avco Broadcasting Corporation for about $13 million. The station had changed its call letters to WDTN once the sale closed. Shortly after WDTN becoming an ABC affiliate, the station was sold off to Hearst Broadcasting for $45–$48 million.

In 2022, Grinnell became the first fully unionized undergraduate school in the U.S., when student workers voted to expand their dining hall workers union to include all student workers. The move was supported by the President of the college.

Campus 
Grinnell College is located in the town of Grinnell, Iowa, about halfway between Des Moines and Iowa City. The main campus is bounded by 6th Avenue (which is also US Highway 6) on the south, 10th Avenue on the north, East Street on the east and Park Street on the west. The  campus contains sixty-three buildings ranging in style from Collegiate Gothic to Bauhaus. Goodnow Hall and Mears Cottage (1889) are listed on the National Register of Historic Places. Immediately west of the college is the North Grinnell Historic District, which contains over 200 National Register of Historic Places contributing buildings.

The residential part of campus is divided into three sections: North Campus, East Campus, and South Campus. North and South Campus' dormitories are modeled explicitly after the residential colleges of Oxford and Cambridge. The four East Campus dormitories were designed by William Rawn Associates and feature a modern, LEED-certified design constructed from Iowa limestone.

All three campuses feature dormitory buildings connected by loggia, an architectural signature of the college. The loggia on South Campus is the only entirely closed loggia, featuring walls on all sides, while the loggias on East and North campus are only partially closed. From the time that the first dorm opened in 1915 until the fall of 1968, the nine north campus dorms were used exclusively for male students, and the six south campus dorms reserved for female students. The dorm halls house significantly fewer students than halls at other colleges.

Most academic buildings are located on the southwestern quarter of campus. The athletic facilities are mostly located north of 10th Avenue.

In addition to the main campus, the college owns much of the adjacent property. Many administrative offices are located in converted houses across Park Street near the older academic buildings, and several residences are used for college-owned off-campus student housing.

The college maintains a  environmental research area called the Conard Environmental Research Area (CERA). The U.S. Green Building Council awarded CERA's Environmental Education Center a gold certification. The building is the first in Iowa to receive the designation.

During the 2000s, the college completed the Charles Benson Bear '39 Recreation and Athletic Center, the Bucksbaum Center for the Arts, the renovation of the Robert Noyce '49 Science Center and the Joe Rosenfield '25 Student Center. Internationally renowned architect César Pelli designed the athletics center, the Joe Rosenfield '25 Student Center, and the Bucksbaum Center for the Arts.

The college has recently embarked on a significant period of new construction, which is expected to last until 2034. The first phase of this construction process included a comprehensive landscaping update, a new Admissions and Financial Aid building, and the Humanities and Social Sciences Complex (HSSC). This first phase cost $140 million and was completed in mid-2020.  The second phase, currently in planning, is focused on the Downtown Student Residence project (DSR) including a building designed by renowned architecture firm Adjaye Associates.

Academics 
Grinell's most popular majors among 2021 graduates were:
Computer Science (42)
Biology/Biological Sciences (33)
Research & Experimental Psychology (27)
Econometrics & Quantitative Economics	(25)
Biochemistry (24)
Sociology	(24)
Political Science & Government (23)

Graduate programs
Although the college does not offer any graduate degrees, it does have dual degree programs with several universities that let Grinnell students move directly into graduate programs. Grinnell participates in a 3–2 engineering dual degree program with Columbia University, Washington University in St. Louis, Rensselaer Polytechnic Institute, and California Institute of Technology. It also has a 2–1–1–1 engineering program with Dartmouth College and a Master of Public Health cooperative degree program with University of Iowa.

Reputation 

Grinnell College has been listed in each edition of Howard & Matthew Greene's guides The Hidden Ivies.

The 2022 annual ranking of U.S. News & World Report rates it tied for the 15th best liberal arts college overall in the U.S., 6th for "Best Undergraduate Teaching, 8th for "Best Value", and tied for 18th for "Most Innovative". Grinnell is ranked 5th in the 2021 Washington Monthly rankings for liberal arts colleges, which focus on key outputs such as research, dollar value of scientific grants won, the number of graduates going on to earn Ph.D. degrees, and certain types of public service. The college has been consistently ranked in the top 25 liberal arts colleges in the nation since the publication began in 1983. Kiplinger's Personal Finance ranked Grinnell 14th in its 2019 ranking of "best value" liberal arts colleges in the United States.  In Forbes magazine's 2019 rankings of academic institutions, "America's Top Colleges" (which uses a non-traditional ranking system based on RateMyProfessors.com evaluations, notable alumni, student debt, percentage of students graduating in four years, and the number of students or faculty receiving prestigious awards), Grinnell College was ranked 80th among all colleges and universities, 34th among liberal arts colleges, and 10th in the Midwest.

Faculty 
Grinnell had 173 full-time faculty in Fall 2020, all of whom possess a doctorate or the terminal degree in their field.

Admission

U.S. News & World Report classifies Grinnell's selectivity as "most selective."  For Fall 2022, Grinnell received 11,658 freshmen applications; 1,073 were admitted (9.2%).In 2021, Grinnell received 10,587 applicants and admitted 10.5% of them. During the 2020-2021 application season, Grinnell offered a standardized test-optional application, due to limited testing access caused by the global COVID-19 pandemic.  The middle 50% range of SAT scores for the enrolled freshmen was 670–750 for critical reading and 683–788 for math, while the ACT Composite range was 30–34.

Grinnell College's admission selectivity rating, according to The Princeton Review in 2018, is a 95 out of 99. This rating is determined by several institutionally reported factors, including: the class rank, average standardized test scores, and average high school GPA of entering freshmen; the percentage of students who hail from out-of-state; and the percentage of applicants accepted.

The primary factor in evaluating applicants is the quality of the prior education they have received, as shown by their transcript. Additional factors include standardized test scores, student writing skills, recommendations, and extracurricular activities.

Early decision rounds are offered to students in the fall; most students apply in January of their final year in high school. Admission decisions are released late March or early April of each year. All students begin classes in August.

The students' expectation of needing financial assistance does not affect the admission process.

Graduation rates 
Despite the growing trend of U.S. students taking five or more years to finish an undergraduate degree, Grinnell College is strongly oriented towards students being enrolled full-time in exactly eight consecutive semesters at the college, although exceptions are available for medical issues and other emergencies. To avoid being suspended from the college, students must make "normal progress towards graduation." This generally means that the student must pass at least 12 credits of classes in each individual semester, with grades C or higher, and have accumulated enough credits to make graduation possible at the end of four years, which requires an average of 15.5 credits each semester. A student who is not making normal progress towards graduation is placed on academic probation and may be dismissed from the college.

Nationwide, only 20% of college students complete a four-year undergraduate degree within four years, and only 57% of college students graduate within six years.  However, at Grinnell College, 84% of students graduate within four years. This is the highest graduation rate of any college in Iowa.

Associated Colleges of the Midwest membership 
Grinnell is a member of the Associated Colleges of the Midwest, an academic consortium of 14 liberal arts colleges in the Midwest and Colorado which coordinates several off-campus study programs in a large number of countries as its primary activity.

Tuition and financial aid 

Grinnell's combined tuition, room, board, and fees for the 2022–2023 academic year is $76,528. Tuition and fees are $61,480 and room and board are $15,048.

Grinnell College is one of a few dozen US colleges that maintain need-blind admissions and meets the full demonstrated financial need of all U.S. residents who are admitted to the college. Grinnell offers a large amount of need-based and merit-based aid in comparison with peer institutions. Currently (2020–21), 86% of students receive some form of financial aid. In 2018–2019, 20% of students enrolled at Grinnell College were receiving federal Pell Grants, which are generally reserved for students from low-income families. The average financial aid package is over $51,770. Grinnell guarantees a $10,000 Grinnell Choice Scholarship renewable for eight semesters to all U.S. citizens and permanent residents admitted under the Early Decision program.

Beginning with the first-year students enrolled in the 2006–2007 school year, Grinnell ended its need-blind admissions policy for international applicants. Under the old policy, students from countries outside the U.S. were admitted without any consideration of their ability to afford four years of study at the college. However, financial aid offers to these students were limited to half the cost of tuition. International students frequently carried very high workloads in an effort to pay the bills, and their academic performance often suffered. Under the new "need-sensitive" or "need-aware" policy, international students whose demonstrated financial needs can be met are given a slight admissions edge over applicants who can't. The twin hopes are that the enrolled international students will be able to dedicate more energy to their schoolwork, and also that this will ultimately allow the college to provide higher tuition grants to international students.

Athletics 

The school's varsity sports teams are named the Pioneers. They participate in eighteen intercollegiate sports at the NCAA Division III level and in the Midwest Conference. In addition, Grinnell has several club sports teams that compete in non-varsity sports such as volleyball, sailing, water polo, ultimate and rugby union.

Nearly one-third of recent Grinnell graduates participated in at least one of varsity sports while attending the college and the college has led the Midwest Conference in the total number of Academic All-Conference honorees in last four years (as of 2021).

The Grinnell Pioneers won the first game of intercollegiate football west of the Mississippi when they beat the University of Iowa 24–0 on November 16, 1889. A stone marker still stands in Grinnell Field marking the event.

The men's water polo team, known as the Wild Turkeys, were runners-up in the 2007 College Water Polo Association (CWPA) Division III Collegiate National Club Championships hosted by Lindenwood University in St. Charles, Missouri. They also qualified for the tournament in 2008, 2009, 2011, 2013, and 2014. The Men's Ultimate team, nicknamed the Grinnellephants, qualified in 2008 for its first Division III National Championship in Versailles, Ohio. The Women's Ultimate team, nicknamed The Sticky Tongue Frogs, tied for third place in the 2010 Division III National Championship in Appleton, Wisconsin. The success was repeated in 2011 when the men's team placed third in 2011 Division III National Championship in Buffalo.

In February 2005, Grinnell became the first Division III school featured in a regular season basketball game by the ESPN network family in 30 years when it faced off against the Beloit Buccaneers on ESPN2. Grinnell lost 86–85. Grinnell College's basketball team attracted ESPN due to the team's run and gun style of playing basketball, known in Grinnell simply as "The System." Coach Dave Arseneault originated the Grinnell System that incorporates a continual full-court press, a fast-paced offense, an emphasis on offensive rebounding, a barrage of three-point shots and substitutions of five players at a time every 35 to 40 seconds. This allows a higher average playing time for more players than the "starters" and suits the Division III goals of scholar-athletes. "The System" has been criticized for not teaching the principles of defense. However, under "The System," Grinnell has won three conference championships over the past ten years and have regularly placed in the top half of the conference. Coach Arseneault's teams have set numerous NCAA scoring records and several individuals on the Grinnell team have led the nation in scoring or assists.

On November 19, 2011, Grinnell player Griffin Lentsch set a new Division III individual scoring record in a game against Principia College. The  guard scored 89 points, besting the old record of 77, also set by a Pioneers player—Jeff Clement—in 1998. Lentsch made 27 of his 55 shots, including 15 three-pointers as Grinnell won the high-scoring game 145 to 97. On November 20, 2012, Grinnell's Jack Taylor broke Lentsch's scoring record, as well as the records for NCAA and collegiate scoring, in a 179–104 victory over Faith Baptist Bible College. Taylor scored 138 points on 108 shots, along with 3 rebounds, 6 turnovers and 3 steals. Taylor went 27 for 71 from behind the arc. Taylor scored 109 points in a November 2013 game against Crossroads College to become the first player in NCAA history to have two 100-point games.

In 2019, the Grinnell women's volleyball team advanced to the NCAA Division III National Tournament for the first time in the 46-year history of the program, defeating St. Norbert College in a five-set thriller during the Midwest Conference Tournament championship match at Cornell College's gymnasium. It also marked Grinnell's first-ever MWC Tournament title in volleyball.

Social activities and organizations 

Students at Grinnell adhere to an honor system known as "self-governance" wherein they are expected to govern their own choices and behavior with minimal direct intervention by the college administration. By cultivating a community based on freedom of choice, self-governance aims to encourage students to become responsible, respectful, and accountable members of the campus, town, and global community.

The organizational structure of the Student Government Association, wielding a yearly budget of over $450,000 and unusually strong administrative influence, covers almost all aspects of student activity and campus life.

Founded in November 2000, the student-run group Pioneer Capital Investments (PCI), formerly known as Student Endowment Investing Group, actively invests over $100,000 of Grinnell College's endowment capital in public equities. The group's mission is to provide interested students with valuable experience for future careers in finance.

Service organizations are popular. The Alternative Break ("AltBreak") program takes students to pursue service initiatives during school holidays, and as of 2005, Grinnell had more alumni per capita serving in the Peace Corps than any other college in the nation. The college also runs its own post-graduation service program known as Grinnell Corps in Grinnell, China, Namibia, New Orleans, and Thailand, and has previously operated programs in Greece, Lesotho, Macau, and Nepal.

The Scarlet and Black is the campus newspaper and KDIC (88.5 FM) was the student-run radio station from 1968 to 2020. The Scarlet and Black, or the S&B is the oldest college newspaper west of the Mississippi River, and is currently in its 130th year of publication. The newspaper, typically 16 tabloid pages in length, is published in print most Mondays of the school year and online. Students primarily write the newspaper, although occasional letters from alumni or faculty are included. Funding comes from student fees and advertisers.

The school also has a bi-weekly satirical newspaper, "The B&S," which features articles about current events both on and off campus. "The B&S" satirizes social and political issues in articles, graphics, and crosswords.

Grinnell also has an entirely student-run textbook lending library on campus. Aimed at the economically disadvantaged yet open to all, it allows students to check out books for the semester for free, defraying the high cost of college textbooks. This particular library has no funding, relying solely on donated books. Since its founding in 2005, the collection has grown to thousands of books, thanks to the generosity of the campus community. This library has expanded to include caps and gowns, which are lent out to graduating seniors every spring.

Grinnell hosts the Titular Head student film festival.

Union of Grinnell Student Dining Workers 
In 2016, Grinnell students founded the Union of Grinnell Student Dining Workers, or UGSDW, to represent student workers in the college's dining hall. It was the first undergraduate student workers union at a private college in the United States.  

On April 26, 2022, members of the Union voted 327-6 to expand the Union to all hourly paid student workers on campus. This made Grinnell the first and only fully unionized student-worker body in the country.  

On October 6th, 2022, the UGSDW and the College began negotiations. This was the first bargaining session in American labor history that began the negotiation process for a contract that covers all student-workers on campus. This bargaining will negotiate a contract for all student workers on campus and cover issues such as but not limited to pay, workplace grievances, and job security.

Notable alumni 
 
 William A. Noyes, 1879, an analytical and organic chemist who made pioneering determinations of atomic weights
 George Edward White, 1882, American Congregationalist missionary, president of Anatolia College, witness to the Armenian genocide
 Sen Katayama, 1892, co-founder in 1922 of Japanese Communist Party
George A. Wilson, 1903, Iowa Governor and United States Senator
Oliver Buckley, 1901, President, Bell Labs
Cornelia Clarke, 1909, Nature photographer
 Hallie Flanagan, 1911, pioneer of experimental theatre and director, the Federal Theatre Project of the Works Progress Administration; first woman to win a Guggenheim Fellowship
 Harry Hopkins, 1912, senior advisor to Franklin Delano Roosevelt, principal architect of New Deal, WPA administrator.
 Joseph Welch, 1914, head attorney for United States Army during Army-McCarthy Hearings
 Gary Cooper, 1922, Academy Award-winning-winning actor, best known for High Noon
 Frank W. Cyr, 1923, "Father of the Yellow School Bus"
K. C. Wu, 1923, Mayor of Shanghai and Governor of Taiwan Province
Morgan Taylor, 1924, American hurdler and the first athlete to win three Olympic medals in the 400 m hurdles
Joseph Rosenfield, 1925, Head of Younkers department store and friend of Warren Buffett
Edwina Florence Wills, 1937, artist and composer
 Clair Cameron Patterson, 1943, American geochemist, measurement of age of Earth, campaign against lead poisoning, J. Lawrence Smith Medal, V. M. Goldschmidt Award
 Robert Noyce, 1949, co-founder of Intel, co-inventor of the integrated circuit, National Medal of Science recipient
 Herbie Hancock, 1960, Grammy Award-winning jazz musician and composer
Martha Cooper, 1963, Icon of the Street art movement and author of Subway Art
 Peter Coyote, 1964, American actor, author, director, screenwriter and narrator of films, theatre, television and audiobooks. He is known for his work in various films such as E.T. the Extra-Terrestrial (1982) and Erin Brockovich (2000)
 Mary Sue Coleman, 1965, president of the University of Iowa (1995–2002) and the University of Michigan (2002–2014)
David Maxwell, 1966, Scholar of Anton Chekhov and president of Drake University
Nordahl Brue, 1967, co-founder of Bruegger's bagels and chair of the PKC Corporation and Franklin Foods
 John Garang, 1969, founder of the Sudan People's Liberation Movement and former Vice President of Sudan
 Thomas Cech, 1970, co-winner of 1989 Nobel Prize in Chemistry, president of Howard Hughes Medical Institute
Greg Thielmann, 1972, Intelligence analyst for the United States Department of State and critic of the 2003 invasion of Iraq
Paul McCulley, 1979, American economist and former managing director at PIMCO.
 Bernice King, 1985 graduate of Spelman College, American minister, best known as the youngest daughter of slain civil rights leader Martin Luther King Jr. and Coretta Scott King
Eric E. Whitaker, 1987, Prominent African American physician, health policy expert and close friend to President Barack Obama
May-lee Chai, 1989, author, professor and American Book Award winner
Thomas Meglioranza, 1992, American operatic baritone
Christine Thornburn, 1992,  American physician and Olympic cyclist, U.S. women's individual time trial champion in 2004, and later represented the United States in 2004 and 2008 Olympic Games
Ian Shoemaker, 1996, American Football Coach
 Emily Bergl, 1997, English-American actress and singer, best known for her roles as Tammi Bryant on the TNT drama series Southland (TV series) (2009–2013) and Sammi Slott in Shameless (American TV series) (2014–2015)
 Florin Cîțu, 1999, Prime Minister of Romania (2020-2021)
 Kumail Nanjiani, 2001, comedian, actor, screenwriter and podcaster, best known for his role as Dinesh on HBO’s comedy series Silicon Valley, and for co-writing and starring in the romantic comedy The Big Sick.
 Chase Strangio, 2004, deputy director for Transgender Justice at the American Civil Liberties Union, included in 2020's Time 100 most influential people in the world

References

External links 

 
Buildings and structures in Poweshiek County, Iowa
Education in Poweshiek County, Iowa
Educational institutions established in 1846
Liberal arts colleges in Iowa
Tourist attractions in Poweshiek County, Iowa
1846 establishments in Iowa Territory
Grinnell, Iowa
Private universities and colleges in Iowa